Angelos Terzakis (16 February 1907 – 3 August 1979) was a Greek writer of the "Generation of the '30s". He wrote short stories, novels and plays.

Life
He was born in Nafplion in 1907 and lived there until 1915, when he moved to Athens, where he finished school and studied law at the University of Athens. He made his first appearance in Greek literature in 1925 with the short story collection The Forgotten (Ο Ξεχασμένος). He took part in the war of 1940 and documented this experience in some of his short stories and especially in his book April (Απρίλης). In 1969 he was awarded the prize of Literary Excellence (Αριστείο Γραμμάτων) of the Athens Academy.

He died on 3 August 1979 in Athens. His son, Dimitri Terzakis, is a noted composer.

Works

Novels
 Prisoners (Δεσμώτες, 1932)
 The Decline of the Skleros family (Η παρακμή των Σκληρών, 1933)
 The Purple City (Η Μενεξεδένια Πολιτεία, 1937)
 Princess Isabeau (Η πριγκηπέσσα Ιζαμπώ, 1945)
 Journey with Esperus (Ταξίδι με τον Έσπερο, 1946)
 The Twilight of Men (Το λυκόφως των ανθρώπων, 1947)
 Without God (Δίχως Θεό, 1951)
 The Secret Life (Η μυστική ζωή, 1957)
 The Novel of the Four (Το Μυθιστόρημα των Τεσσάρων, 1958) (written together with Karagatsis, Myrivilis and Venezis)

Short story collections
 The Forgotten (Ο ξεχασμένος, 1925)
 Automn SYmphony (Φθινοπωρινή συμφωνία, 1929)
 Of Love and of Death (Του έρωτα και του θανάτου, 1943)
 April (Απρίλης, 1946)
 Affection (Η στοργή, 1944)

Plays
 Emperor Michael (Αυτοκράτωρ Μιχαήλ, 1936)
 Wedding March (Γαμήλιο Εμβατήριο, 1937)
 The Cross and the Sword (Ο σταυρός και το σπαθί, 1939)
 Helots (Είλωτες, 1939)
 The Master (Ο εξουσιαστής, 1942)
 The Great Game (Το μεγάλο παιχνίδι, 1944)
 Pure (Αγνή, 1949)
 Theofano (Θεοφανώ, 1956)
 Night in the Mediterranean (Νύχτα στη Μεσόγειο, 1957)
 The Happiness Ransom (Τα λύτρα της ευτυχίας, 1959)
 Thomas the Two-Souled One (Θωμάς ο δίψυχος, 1962)
 The Ancestor (Ο πρόγονος, 1970)

Footnotes

References
 K. Mitsakis, Νεοελληνική πεζογραφία. Η γενιά του ’30. Athens, 1977
 M. Vitti, The thirties' generation. Ideology and shape. Athens, 1979
 K. A. Dimadis, Δικτατορία-Πόλεμος και πεζογραφία 1936–1944. Athens, 1991

1907 births
1979 deaths
National and Kapodistrian University of Athens alumni
20th-century Greek dramatists and playwrights
Generation of the '30s
Greek journalists
20th-century Greek novelists
Theatre in Greece
People from Nafplion
Members of the Academy of Athens (modern)
Greek essayists
20th-century novelists
Greek male writers
Male novelists
Male dramatists and playwrights
Male essayists
20th-century essayists
20th-century Greek male writers
Greek military personnel of World War II
20th-century journalists